The Diocese of Tlaxcala is a Latin Church ecclesiastical territory or diocese of the Catholic Church in Mexico. It is a suffragan in the ecclesiastical province of the metropolitan Archdiocese of Puebla de los Ángeles, which was itself officially named the Diocese of Tlaxcala until 1903.  The present Diocese of Tlaxcala was erected on 23 May 1959 from territory of that archdiocese and the adjacent Archdiocese of Mexico. Its cathedra is found within the Cathedral of Our Lady of the Assumption in the episcopal see of Tlaxcala.

Bishops

Ordinaries
Luis Munive Escobar (1959–2001)
Jacinto Guerrero Torres (2001–2006)
Francisco Moreno Barrón (2008–2016)
Julio César Salcedo Aquino, M.J. (2017–)

Coadjutor bishop
Jacinto Guerrero Torres (1991-2001)

References

Tlaxcala
Christian organizations established in 1959
Roman Catholic dioceses and prelatures established in the 20th century
Tlaxcala
Tlaxcala, Roman Catholic Diocese of